The Michigan State Spartans college football team competes as part of the National Collegiate Athletic Association (NCAA) Division I Football Bowl Subdivision (FBS), representing Michigan State University in the Big Ten Conference (Big Ten). Since the establishment of the team in 1896, Michigan State has appeared in 30 bowl games. Included in these games are five appearances in the Rose Bowl Game. Through the history of the program, nine separate coaches have led the Spartans to bowl games with Mark Dantonio having the most appearances with twelve. The Spartans have a bowl record of 14–16 through the 2021 season.

Key

Bowl games

Record by bowl game

Notes

References
General

Specific

Michigan State

Michigan State Spartans bowl games